Willcocks is a surname, and may refer to the following:

Dianne Willcocks, Dianne Marie Willcocks CBE (born 5 May 1945 was the Vice-Chancellor of York St John University until retirement in April 2010
Sir David Willcocks (1919–2015), British choral conductor and composer
James Willcocks, General Sir James Willcocks GCB GCMG KCSI DSO (1 April 1857–18 December 1926) was a British Army officer
Jonathan Willcocks,  British composer
Joseph Willcocks (1773–1814), Canadian publisher, soldier, and political figure
Leslie Willcocks, Leslie P. Willcocks, a Professor of Technology Work and Globalization and governor of the Information Systems and Innovation Group at the London School of Economics
Michael Willcocks (born 1944), British General, Gentleman Usher of the Black Rod for the UK House of Lords
William Willcocks (1852–1932), British civil engineer

See also
Wilcock
Wilcox (disambiguation)
Wilcox (surname)
Willcock
Willcox (disambiguation)
Willcox (surname)
Willock
Wilcoxon

English-language surnames
Patronymic surnames